The 1986 Segunda División de Chile was the 35th season of the Segunda División de Chile.

Lota Schwager was the tournament's champion.

Final table

North Zone

South Zone

Promotion Playoffs

See also
Chilean football league system

References

External links
 RSSSF - List of Second Division Champions

Segunda División de Chile (1952–1995) seasons
Primera B
1985 in South American football leagues